Copernicia cowellii is a palm which is endemic to Camagüey Province, Cuba.

References

cowellii
Trees of Cuba